Waterford is a town in Caledonia County, Vermont, United States. The population was 1,268 at the 2020 census.

History 
The town was formed by the Vermont charter on November 8, 1780, and was originally called Littleton, but the name was changed to Waterford in 1797. The town may have been named after Waterford, Ireland, or for the ford that ran across the Connecticut River in that area.

Geography
Waterford is in eastern Caledonia County on the Connecticut River, the eastern border of Vermont. The town is bordered by Barnet to the west, St. Johnsbury to the northwest, Kirby to the north, and Concord, Vermont, to the east. The town of Littleton, New Hampshire, is to the south, across the Connecticut River.

The town is crossed by Interstate 93 and Interstate 91. The northern terminus of I-93, at I-91, is in the western corner of the town, just south of St. Johnsbury. Exit 1 on I-93 serves the northern part of Waterford. Vermont Route 18 is a two-lane highway that parallels I-93.

The highest point in Waterford is the  summit of Fuller Hill, near the town's eastern border.

Demographics

At the 2000 census there were 1,104 people in 424 households, including 340 families, in the town.  The population density was 28.9 people per square mile (11.2/km2).  There were 477 housing units at an average density of 12.5 per square mile (4.8/km2).  The racial makeup of the town was 98.55% White, 0.27% Asian, and 1.18% from two or more races. Hispanic or Latino of any race were 0.27%.

Of the 424 households 32.1% had children under the age of 18 living with them, 71.7% were married couples living together, 5.4% had a female householder with no husband present, and 19.8% were non-families. 15.8% of households were one person and 6.1% were one person aged 65 or older.  The average household size was 2.60 and the average family size was 2.88.

The age distribution was 24.6% under the age of 18, 4.3% from 18 to 24, 25.7% from 25 to 44, 31.4% from 45 to 64, and 13.9% 65 or older.  The median age was 42 years. For every 100 females, there were 104.4 males.  For every 100 females age 18 and over, there were 100.5 males.

Arts and culture
The area known as "White Village" features homes from the 1700s, a church, library, post office and bed and breakfast.

Economy

Personal income
The median household income was $50,197 and the median family income  was $52,105. Males had a median income of $32,100 versus $23,839 for females. The per capita income for the town was $21,762.  About 2.3% of families and 4.2% of the population were below the poverty line, including 3.3% of those under age 18 and 6.3% of those age 65 or over.

Waterford has the highest per capita income of any town or city in

the Northeast Kingdom. It ranks 74 out of 282 census areas in Vermont.

Education
Waterford Public Schools are part of the Caledonia Central Supervisory Union. The district serves students in prekindergarten to eighth grade.

Notable people

 Amos K. Hadley, Speaker of the New York State Assembly
 Jonathan Ross, Chief Justice of the Vermont Supreme Court and a United States senator from Vermont

In popular culture
The film State and Main is about a film production; it is set in Waterford, although it was actually filmed in Massachusetts.

References

External links
 
 Town of Waterford official website
 Waterford Volunteer Fire Department
 City-Data.com
 ePodunk: Profile for Waterford, Vermont, VT
 Waterford, Vermont, History
 Waterford School

 
Towns in Vermont
Vermont populated places on the Connecticut River
Towns in Caledonia County, Vermont
Populated places established in 1780
1780 establishments in Vermont